Komotin Castle is a ruined castle in Bosnia and Herzegovina, in the Jajce Municipality.

Background
Komotin is believed to have been built in the early 14th century. The last Bosnian King Stephen Tomašević issued a charter which gave Komotin to his uncle Radivoj Kotromanić.

The architecture shows that komotin was a manorial court, but its positioning high on a hill that was difficult to access other than by narrow winding paths made it easily defendable. Once intruders and invaders had gotten up the path they then had a moat to contend with that could only be crossed by drawbridge. Within the walls was also a large and small bailey, plus quarters and accommodations.

Protection
As of late the castle has been deemed important as a national monument and has been listed as a protected building.

References

Castles in Bosnia and Herzegovina
National Monuments of Bosnia and Herzegovina